Loflammiopsis is a genus of lichenized fungi in the family Pilocarpaceae. This is a monotypic genus, containing the single species Loflammiopsis brasiliensis.

References

Pilocarpaceae
Lichen genera
Monotypic Lecanorales genera
Taxa named by Klaus Kalb
Taxa described in 2000
Taxa named by Robert Lücking